Asociación Mexicana de Productores de Fonogramas y Videogramas (AMPROFON) (English: Mexican Association of Producers of Phonograms and Videograms, A.C.) is a non-profit organization integrated by multinational and national record companies in Mexico. Established on April 3, 1963, it is a trade association of phonographic companies that represent more than 70 percent of the market in Mexico. AMPROFON is an associated member of the International Federation of the Phonographic Industry (IFPI).

History
The organisation was founded under the name Phonographic Discs Producers (AMPRODISC) in Mexico on April 3. 1963. The aim was to create a civil association to represent the rights and interests of the producers of phonographic recordings. The members were:
 Compañía Importadora de Discos, S.A.
 CBS de Mexico, S.A.
 Discos Mexicanos, S.A.
 Fábrica de Discos Peerless, S.A.
 GAMMA, S.A.
 Panamericana de Discos, S.A.
 RCA Victor Mexicana, S.A.

On July 26, 1971, the name was changed to Mexican Phonogram Producers Association (Asociación Mexicana de Productores de Fonogramas) and, as a result of the new medium of music videos, on May 3, 1990, the name was changed to Mexican Association of Producers of Phonograms and Videograms (AMPROFON), its current name.

Sales certificates
The AMPROFON awards certificates for music releases in Mexico. The level of the award varies depending on the format of the release and the quantity shipped. Certificates are usually awarded on the basis of the number of units the release has shipped, rather than the number it has sold.

The certification award order for Mexico differs from many other certification providers. Most countries award at most one gold album, after which subsequent awards will be platinum, multiplying each time the platinum threshold is again passed (i.e., gold – platinum – 2×platinum – 3×platinum, etc.). However, AMPROFON will add incremental awards for platinum or gold to a recording which has already achieved platinum status (i.e., gold – platinum – platinum+gold – 2×platinum – 2×platinum+gold, etc.), each time a sales threshold is crossed.

Music charts
Charts are updated every Wednesday evening covering national sales in four different album charts:
 Top 100 Mexico albums chart. The list of the 100 best-selling albums in the country. All musical genres are counted as well as EPs.
 Spanish Albums Chart. This the Top 20 of Pop, Rock and Dance albums in Spanish, no matter the nationality. Any album in Spanish is eligible to appear on this chart.
 Popular Music Albums Chart. This is the Top 20 of regional Mexican music, be it ranchera, grupero, or others.
 International Albums Chart. Although labeled "Inglés (English)", this Top-20 chart counts "international" releases, since artists with non-English albums are also included in this chart, no matter the nationality. An album in Spanish will not be eligible to appear on this chart.

AMPROFON does not produce charts for physical sales of single releases, although it does certify shipped quantities for them until June 30, 2009. As of 2017, it publishes a weekly streaming singles chart.

See also
Monitor Latino
List of best-selling albums in Mexico

Notes

References

External links 
 Official site
 This week's Top 100
 This week's Genre Top 20 charts
 Site with charts archive

Organizations established in 1963
Music organizations based in Mexico
Music industry associations
1963 establishments in Mexico